Lapa is a municipality in the state of Paraná, in the Southern Region of Brazil.

The municipality contains the  Monge State Park, created in 1960.

See also
List of municipalities in Paraná
Genealogy of the emigrants from Bukovina in Lapa, Brazil

References

Municipalities in Paraná